This Is My Song was a Patti Page LP album, issued by Mercury Records as catalog number MG-20102 in 1957.

Track listing

References

Patti Page albums
1956 compilation albums
Mercury Records compilation albums